The NAIA Football Coach of the Year is awarded annually to the best college football coach in the National Association of Intercollegiate Athletics. From 1979 to 1996, a separate award was given to the best coach in each of the NAIA's two football divisions.

Winners

Single award (1956–1978)
Note: Even though the NAIA split its football championship into two divisions in 1970, only a single Coach of the Year award was given out until 1979.

Separate awards (1979–1996)

Division I

Division II

Single award (1997–present)

Coaches with multiple wins

Schools with multiple wins

References

College football coach of the year awards in the United States
Awards established in 1956